Nemanja Knežević (born 11 January 1984) is a Montenegrin water polo coach. He was the head coach of the Kazakhstan men's national water polo team at the 2020 Summer Olympics.

References

External links
 

1984 births
Living people
Montenegrin male water polo players
Montenegrin water polo coaches
Kazakhstan men's national water polo team coaches
Water polo coaches at the 2020 Summer Olympics